The 1999–2000 Spartan South Midlands Football League season is the 3rd in the history of Spartan South Midlands Football League a football competition in England.

Premier Division

The Premier Division featured 18 clubs which competed in the division last season, along with three new clubs, promoted from the Senior Division:
Biggleswade Town
Hanwell Town
Holmer Green

League table

Senior Division

The Senior Division featured 17 clubs which competed in the division last season, along with three new clubs:
Ampthill Town, promoted from Division One
Bridger Packaging, promoted from Division One
Brimsdown Rovers, relegated from the Premier Division

Also, Milton Keynes changed name to Bletchley Town.

League table

Division One

The Division One featured 14 clubs which competed in the division last season, along with three new clubs:
Buckingham Athletic, demoted from the Premier Division
Crawley Green, new club
Winslow United, relegated from the Senior Division

League table

References

External links
 FCHD Spartan South Midlands Football League page

1999–2000
1999–2000 in English football leagues